The 2008 North African Cup Winners Cup was the first edition of the competition created by the Federation of North African Football. ES Tunis were the champions, defeating JSM Béjaïa 2-1 over two legs.

Participating teams

1 FAR Rabat won the Coupe du Trône, but as they are already playing the North African Cup of Champions, Maghreb Fez were invited to compete instead.

2 Al Zamalek withdrew.

The System
The Libyan representative and the Moroccan representative will contest a two-legged tie, first leg on November 19, second leg November 25, to qualify for the semi-finals, the draw for which will be made on November 23 in Tunis. The semi-finals will be played sometime in December, with the final being played in January 2009.

The Awards
 The Champions: $100,000
 The Runner-up: $50,000
 3rd & 4th Place: $20,000 (shared)

The qualifying round
 Khaleej Sirte 0 - 4  Maghreb Fez

First leg

Second leg

Maghreb Fez advance to the Semi-finals with an aggregate score of 4-0

Semi-finals
The draw for this round of the competition was made on November 23 in Tunis. The first legs will be played on December 18, and the second legs will be played either on December 24 or December 26.
JSM Béjaïa, Al-Masry and ES Tunis were automatically given byes to this round of the competition. These three teams and the winner of the qualifying stage will make up the semi-finals.

Draw

First Legs

 Al-Masry 1 - 0  JSM Béjaïa  (December 5)
 ES Tunis 4 - 4  Maghreb Fez (December 18)

Second Legs
 Maghreb Fez 0 - 1  ES Tunis (December 24) 
 JSM Béjaïa  2 - 0  Al-Masry (December 26)

ES Tunis advance to the Final with an aggregate score of 5-4

JSM Béjaïa advance to the Final with an aggregate score of 2-1

Final

First leg

Second leg

attendance = 40.000

External links
 North African Cup Winners Cup at goalzz.com

North African Cup Winners Cup
North African Cup Winners Cup, 2008
2008–09 in Moroccan football
2008–09 in Algerian football
2008–09 in Libyan football
2008–09 in Tunisian football
2008–09 in Egyptian football